First performance of Henrik Ibsen's A Doll's House

Events in the year 1877 in Norway.

Incumbents
Monarch: Oscar II

Events
 25 April - The local newspaper Agder Flekkefjords Tidende was first published.
 The Røros Line was opened.

Arts and literature

First performance of A Doll's House

Births

January to June

25 February – Bernt Tunold, painter (died 1946)
5 March – Klaus Sletten, organizational worker, editor and politician (died 1946)
23 March – Marta Steinsvik, author and translator (died 1950)
29 March – Nils Waltersen Aasen, arms inventor (died 1925)
12 April – Ragnvald A. Nestos, governor of the U.S. state of North Dakota (died 1942)
19 April – Ole Evinrude, inventor, known for the invention of the first outboard motor with practical commercial application (died 1934)
26 April – Alfred Næss, speed skater (died 1955)
5 May  – Halfdan Egedius, painter and illustrator (died 1899)
6 May – Bjarne Solberg, physician and politician (died 1928)

July to December

18 July – Arne Sejersted, sailor and Olympic gold medallist (died 1960)
17 August – Bernhoff Hansen, wrestler and Olympic gold medallist (died 1950)
28 August – Anna Schønheyder, painter and textile artist (died 1927).
8 September – Rasmus Pettersen, gymnast and Olympic gold medallist (died 1957)
8 September – Gunnar Ousland, writer, editor and politician for the Labour Party (died 1967)
13 September – Harald Halvorsen, politician (died 1943).
16 September – Carsten Tank-Nielsen, admiral (died 1957)
9 October – Isak Halvorsen, politician
12 October – Alf Hjort, electrical engineer in America (died 1944)
16 October – Bjørn Helland-Hansen, oceanographer (died 1957)
4 November – Benjamin Blessum, Norwegian-American painter, graphic artist, illustrator (died 1954)

Full date unknown
Ole Ludvig Bærøe, politician (died 1943)
Halfdan Egedius, painter and illustrator (died 1899)
Per Klingenberg Hestetun, politician (died 1928)
Karl Hovelsen, Nordic skier (died 1955)
Ivar Larsen Kirkeby-Garstad, politician and Minister (died 1951)
Lars Oftedal, politician and Minister (died 1932)
Nikolai Nissen Paus, surgeon (died 1956)
Haakon Shetelig, archaeologist (died 1955)
Gunnar Ousland, writer, editor and politician (died 1967)
Erik Solem, judge (died 1949)

Deaths

9 October – Eskild Bruun, barrister, judge and businessman (b. 1804).
25 December – Hans Gerhard Colbjørnsen Meldahl, jurist and politician (born 1815)

Full date unknown
Christian Peder Bianco Boeck, doctor, zoologist and mountaineer (born 1798)
Hans Wille, priest and politician (born 1807)

See also

References